Lindmetsa Landscape Conservation Area is a nature park is located in Saare County, Estonia.

Its area is 51 ha.

The protected area was founded in 2007 to protect forest dunes of Kaunispe and Lindmetsa village.

References

Nature reserves in Estonia
Geography of Saare County